“Last of the English Roses” is the debut solo single by Peter Doherty. The single is the first from his solo album Grace/Wastelands.

The single was released on 9 March 2009 and reached 67 in the UK singles chart.
The song was also performed on Friday Night With Jonathan Ross.

Track listing
"Last Of The English Roses"
"Through The Looking Glass"
"Don't Look Back"
"Salome" (Acoustic)

References

2009 singles
Pete Doherty songs
Songs written by Pete Doherty
2009 songs
Song recordings produced by Stephen Street
Parlophone singles